Fernwood Archeological Site, RI-702 is a  prehistoric archaeological site in South Kingstown, Rhode Island, near the Fernwood Cemetery west of Kingston village.  It is a Native American occupation site which has yielded artifacts dating to before and after contact with Europeans.

The site was listed on the National Register of Historic Places in 1985.

See also
National Register of Historic Places listings in Washington County, Rhode Island

References

Archaeological sites on the National Register of Historic Places in Rhode Island
South Kingstown, Rhode Island
Geography of Washington County, Rhode Island
National Register of Historic Places in Washington County, Rhode Island